Daniel G. Archer (born  September 29, 1944) is a former American football offensive tackle in the American Football League (AFL). he played college football at the University of Oregon, and then professionally for the Oakland Raiders in 1967 and for the Cincinnati Bengals in 1968.  He lives in Belvedere-Tiburon,  California.

Raised in Modesto, California, Mr. Archer studied architecture for four years at the University of Oregon, but drafted by the Army before receiving his degree.  He instead joined the Army Reserves, which afforded him the opportunity to play professional football for two years; the highlight of this brief career was his participation in Super Bowl II with the Oakland Raiders.  He finished his education and received his degree in 1971 in architecture, with honors, from the College of Environmental Design at the University of California, Berkeley.  He is a licensed architect with interests in theater, classical music and bicycling.  He is married and has two sons and one daughter and has lived in Mill Valley, California since 1982 but moved to Belvedere-Tiburon, California in 2020

See also
List of American Football League players

References

External links
Dan Archer stats

1944 births
Living people
Sportspeople from Modesto, California
American football offensive guards
American football offensive tackles
Oregon Ducks football players
Oakland Raiders players
Cincinnati Bengals players
Players of American football from Grand Rapids, Michigan
UC Berkeley College of Environmental Design alumni
American Football League players